Tupla tai kuitti (in English Double or Chit) was a Finnish game show in 1958–1988 and 2007–2008. It is the longest running game show in Finland. It was hosted by Kirsti Rautiainen in 1958–1988 and Kirsi Salo in 2007–2008.

Finnish game shows
1950s game shows
1960s game shows
1970s game shows
1980s game shows
2000s game shows